The tareco is a little tough biscuit, made of wheat flour, eggs and sugar; that, when put into the oven, get the disk shape.

It makes part of the popular culture from the Northeast region of Brazil from far. It is said that the tareco was first made in the state of Pernambuco, and then introduced to all Brazil's Northeast. Its presence is noticed in poetry and lyrics; such as the famous song "Tareco e Mariola" (Tareco and Mariola), by Flávio José.

References

Biscuits
Brazilian cuisine